is a right-wing Japanese imperialist group based in Nagasaki Prefecture, founded in 1981. The group was responsible for a number of violent incidents, including the 1990 near-fatal shooting of the mayor of Nagasaki Hitoshi Motoshima who stated that Emperor Shōwa was responsible for the war. In 1984, the group disrupted a Fuji TV recording session with flares.

See also
 Political extremism in Japan
 Uyoku dantai

Sources
 World Notes Japan Time. 24 Jun 2001.

References

Japanese nationalism

Far-right politics in Japan
Terrorism in Japan
Paramilitary organizations based in Japan